Edelsbrunner Automobile München was a small Bavarian car company based in Munich, Germany. The brand name was EAM.

History 
At the beginning of 1990 the company began producing a small series of two cars in the style of the thirties. Inspired by legendary driver Tazio Nuvolari, the first Roadster was the EAM Nuvolari S1. In the presence of the sister and other relatives of Tazio Nuvolari, the Nuvolari S1 was formally presented and introduced to the public.

Unfortunately the German market at that time was very small and these cars were not successful.

EAM might have been inspired by Nuvolari but the cars design is very much British and loosely based on the 1934 Riley MPH.

Their first model, in Green, was actually exhibited at the Munchen or Frankfurt Motor show.

Models  

There were two types:
EAM Nuvolari S1
EAM Nuvolari R1

The Nuvolari S1 was only produced in small numbers and the R1 model R1 did not get beyond a prototype.

Defunct motor vehicle manufacturers of Germany
Manufacturing companies based in Munich